Cut Ratu Meyriska (born May 26, 1993) is an Indonesian actress, singer, and model from Medan of Acehnese descent. She is known for her roles as an antagonist on various shows.

Personal life 
She featured in the soap opera, "Suci" in 2007 at the age of 14 and appeared on the soap, "Kepompong" at the age of 15. She then appeared in the soap opera, "Arti Sahabat" in 2010. She became famous for her role as a mistress in the soap opera, "Catatan Hati Seorang Istri" in 2014.She appeared on Catatan Hati Seorang Istri in 2016 as an antagonist named Karin, whose nickname was, "Hello Kitty".She appeared in the soap opera, "Boy" in 2017. In 2018, she played a tomboy character named Manda on the show, Anak Langit.

She married soap opera star and singer Roger Danuarta on August 17, 2019, the reception was on August 25, 2019. and on July 17, 2020, Cut gave birth to her first child, Shaquille Kaili Danuarta. On April 22, 2022, Cut gave birth to her second child, Jourell Kenzie Danuarta. Cut returned to acting in 2023, with her role in the soap opera, Belok Kanan Jalan Terus.

Filmography

Movies

Television series

Television films  

 Si Bintit Tukang Ngintip

 Pacarku Banyak Aturan
 Cintaku Kejedot Angkot
 Pacarku Superstar

Discography

References

External link 

 
 
 
 
 

1993 births
Living people
Indonesian actresses
Indonesian television actresses
Indonesian singers
Indonesian women singers
Indonesian models
People from Medan
People from Aceh
Indonesian people of Arab descent
Indonesian people of Indian descent